Willis Gordon McOmber (October 2, 1919 – August 24, 2018) was an American politician from Montana. He served in the Montana House of Representatives and Montana State Senate as a Democrat, having first been elected in 1954. McOmber also served as Lieutenant Governor of Montana to fill out the unexpired term of George Turman when he resigned in 1988.

McOmber's time as Lieutenant Governor occurred when Montana was making preparations for its centennial year. He served as the chairman of Montana's Statehood Centennial Commission which successfully lobbied the U.S. Postal Service to design a stamp commemorating Montana's 100th anniversary.

References

1919 births
2018 deaths
Democratic Party members of the Montana House of Representatives
Democratic Party Montana state senators
People from Magrath
People from Teton County, Montana
Presidents of the Montana Senate